Conchita Martínez was the defending champion but did not compete that year.

Lindsay Davenport won in the final 6–1, 2–6, 6–3 against Florencia Labat.

Seeds
A champion seed is indicated in bold text while text in italics indicates the round in which that seed was eliminated. The top eight seeds received a bye to the second round.

  Magdalena Maleeva (semifinals)
  Lindsay Davenport (champion)
  Natalia Medvedeva (quarterfinals)
  Sabine Hack (third round)
  Julie Halard (second round)
  Shi-Ting Wang (semifinals)
  Stephanie Rottier (second round)
  Barbara Rittner (quarterfinals)
  Ann Grossman (third round)
  Sabine Appelmans (first round)
  Florencia Labat (final)
  Linda Ferrando (third round)
  Irina Spîrlea (third round)
  Angélica Gavaldón (second round)
  Elena Likhovtseva (first round)
  Laura Golarsa (first round)

Draw

Finals

Top half

Section 1

Section 2

Bottom half

Section 3

Section 4

References
 1994 Danone Hardcourt Championships Draw

1994 Singles
1994 WTA Tour
1994 in Australian tennis